Milorad Kosanović (born 4 January 1951) is a Serbian former football player and manager.

During his playing career, Kosanović represented Proleter Zrenjanin, Vojvodina, Kikinda and Novi Sad, competing in the Yugoslav First and Second League.

Afterwards, Kosanović was manager of numerous clubs in his country and abroad, having his most successful period with Chinese club Dalian Shide.

Managerial statistics

Honours
Dalian Shide
 Chinese Jia-A League: 2000, 2001, 2002
 Chinese FA Cup: 2001
 Chinese FA Super Cup: 2000, 2002

References

External links
 

Association football defenders
Chinese Super League managers
Dalian Shide F.C. managers
Expatriate football managers in China
Expatriate football managers in Malta
FK Borac Čačak managers
FK Novi Pazar managers
RFK Novi Sad 1921 players
FK Proleter Zrenjanin players
FK Vojvodina managers
FK Vojvodina players
Beijing Renhe F.C. managers
Malta national football team managers
NK Olimpija Ljubljana (2005) managers
Expatriate football managers in Slovenia
OFK Kikinda players
Red Star Belgrade managers
Serbia and Montenegro expatriates in China
Serbian expatriate sportspeople in China
Serbian expatriate sportspeople in Malta
Serbian football managers
Serbian SuperLiga managers
Serbs of Croatia
Yugoslav First League players
Yugoslav footballers
1951 births
Living people